Glas is a Ukrainian satellite TV channel. Glas broadcasts humanistic, creative, educative programs, based on high ethical principles.

Glas is aimed at an audience of all ages. Most viewers are active, independent people, interested in the history of culture, world and national heritage. The channel exclusively broadcasts original programs of its own production, and stays out of politics. There is no advertisement on the channel.

Slogan
Colors of Your World

Broadcasting
Glas broadcasts its programs via satellite «Sirius 4», which covers the territory of Europe, Middle East and Russia — to Novosibirsk, Nizhnevartovsk and Vorkuta with total audience 1.2 billion people. Satellite broadcasting of 2-hour blocs also provided via satellite «HELLAS SAT 4» (Europe and Asia) and satellite «Intelsat 3R» (North America) with total audience 980 million people by state company «International branch of Ukrainian Television and Radio».
In Ukraine Glas is relayed by 150 cable companies and almost 100 aerial companies.

Achievements and awards
Many programs of the channel gained prizes of international film festivals and state awards. Among them are Gran Prix of International Film Festival «Pokrov», International Festival of Christian Films, prizes of International Festival of Documentary Films «Kinolitopys», «Zolotyj Georgij», Film Festival «Radonezh», International Orthodox Film Festival «Zustrich» and «Crux of Saint Andrij». Channel is awarded by honorary diploma of Ukrainian Government and awards of Ukrainian Orthodox Church. In collaboration with Foreign Ministry, TV-Channel Glas creates presentational films about Ukraine.

Technical capacities
Glas is equipped by modern digital equipment. Studio of virtual reality gives an opportunity to implement new visual means and create programs real-time with post-production. Currently, technology of virtual reality is used in production of commercials, music clips, documentaries and feature films. Such studios save expenses on manufacturing and assembling of decorations, outdoor shootings, and permanent refitting of studios.

Programs, produced by Glas
Cognitive and entertainment programs for kids and youth:
 Cone Forest
 Good Word
 Reserved Ukraine
 Miracles of Universe
 Art of Building
 How and Why
 My Pet
 My Profession

Documentary and educational films
 Heritage
 Portrait
 Craftsman

 Informational
 Chronicle
 Orthodox World
 Weather in Orthodox World
 Weather in Ukraine

Religious and Educational
 Life of Saints
 Way to Sanctity
 Testimonies of Soul
 Pages of the Testaments
 Ways of Virtues

References

External links
 Glas
 Orthodox World
 Cone forest

See also
 List of Ukrainian language television channels

Television stations in Ukraine
Ukrainian brands
Television channels and stations established in 2005
Commercial-free television networks
Christian organizations based in Ukraine
Ukrainian companies established in 2005